Arcangeline Fouodji Sonkbou (born 26 August 1987) is a Cameroonian weightlifter. She participated at the 2014 Commonwealth Games in the 63 kg event. She competed in the women's 69 kg event at the 2016 Summer Olympics.

Major competitions

References

External links
 
 
 
 
 

1987 births
Living people
Cameroonian female weightlifters
Olympic weightlifters of Cameroon
Weightlifters at the 2016 Summer Olympics
Place of birth missing (living people)
Weightlifters at the 2014 Commonwealth Games
Commonwealth Games competitors for Cameroon
20th-century Cameroonian women
21st-century Cameroonian women